The General Electric LM1600 is an industrial and marine gas turbine produced by GE Aviation. The LM1600 is a derivative of the General Electric F404 aircraft engine series.  The LM1600 delivers 20,000 shaft horsepower (shp) (14,920 kW) with a thermal efficiency of 37 percent at ISO conditions.

Applications

Applications include marine propulsion, and industrial use at Dusty Lake Station and Foret LaZaida.

Examples of marine applications
 Destriero
 Enigma
 HSC Stena Voyager
 HSC Stena Explorer
 HSC HSS Discovery
 Mols-Linien

See also

References

External links
 Official site (GEAE).

Aero-derivative engines
Gas turbines
Marine engines